"Memories" is the seventh single by Vamps, released on December 15, 2010. The limited edition came with a DVD that includes the music videos for "Piano Duet" and "Memories". The single reached number 4 on the Oricon chart.

"Memories" was used as the December 2010 ending theme of the TBS TV show Hiruobi!. The B-side is an alternative version of "Get Up" translated into Japanese. A cover of this version of the song was used in the Bakuman anime sung by the character Koogy, who is voiced by Showtaro Morikubo. This version was released as a real-world single by Koogy on February 23, 2010, with the B-side being a Japanese cover of Vamps' "Euphoria".

Track listing

References 

2010 singles
Japanese rock songs
Songs written by Hyde (musician)
2010 songs